Art horror or arthouse horror (sometimes called elevated horror) is a sub-genre of both horror films and art-films. It explores and experiments with the artistic uses of horror.

Characteristics
Art-horror films tend to rely on atmosphere building, psychological character development, cinematic style and philosophical themes for effect - rather than straightforward scares. 

Art-horror films have been described as "a fascinating byproduct of the collision of art and commerce, of genre convention and personal vision". Historically, the genre was loosely related to J-horror and Italian Giallo. In the 2000s, a movement of transgressive films in France known as "New French Extremity" has been described as an arthouse horror film movement.

Although commentators have suggested some horror films have exemplified qualities applicable to "art horror" for many decades, the term became more widely used during the 2010s, with independent film company A24 credited with popularising the genre. The term "elevated horror" was first used in the early 2010s, and subsequently has been the subject of criticism and debate among film critics as it became more widely used.

Notable art horror films

20th century 

 The Cabinet of Dr. Caligari (Robert Wiene, 1920)
 Nosferatu (F.W. Murnau, 1922)
 The Lodger: A Story of the London Fog (Alfred Hitchcock, 1927)
 M (Fritz Lang, 1931)
 Vampyr (Carl Theodor Dreyer, 1932)
 The Bride of Frankenstein (James Whale, 1935)
 Cat People (Jacques Tourneur, 1942)
 The Leopard Man (Jacques Tourneur, 1943)
 I Walked with a Zombie (Jacques Tourneur, 1943)
 Black Sunday (Mario Bava, 1960)
 Eyes without a Face (Georges Franju, 1960)
 Psycho (Alfred Hitchcock, 1960)
 The Innocents (Jack Clayton, 1961)
 Carnival of Souls (Herk Harvey, 1962)
 Blood and Black Lace (Mario Bava, 1964)
 Kwaidan (Masaki Kobayashi, 1965)
 Repulsion (Roman Polanski, 1965)
 Hour of the Wolf (Ingmar Bergman, 1968)
 Rosemary's Baby (Roman Polanski, 1968)
 Images (Robert Altman, 1972)
 Don't Look Now (Nicloas Roeg, 1973)
 Ganja and Hess (Bill Gunn, 1973)
 Sisters (Brian De Palma, 1973)
 Eraserhead (David Lynch, 1977)
 Opening Night (John Cassavetes, 1977)
 Suspiria (Dario Argento, 1977)
 Hausu (Nobuhiko Obayashi, 1977)
 The Brood (David Cronenberg, 1979)
 The Driller Killer (Abel Ferrara, 1979)
 Vengeance Is Mine (Shōhei Imamura, 1979)
 Nosferatu the Vampyre (Werner Herzog, 1979)
 The Shining (Stanley Kubrick, 1980)
 Possession (Andrzej Zulawski, 1981)
 Videodrome (David Cronenberg, 1983)
 The Hunger (Tony Scott, 1983) 
Wicked City (Yoshiaki Kawajiri, 1987)
 The Vanishing (George Sluizer, 1988)
 Twin Peaks: Fire Walk with Me (David Lynch, 1992)
 Cronos (Guillermo del Toro, 1993)
 Safe (Todd Haynes, 1995)
 Funny Games (Michael Haneke, 1997)
 Perfect Blue (Satoshi Kon, 1997)
 Audition (Takashi Miike, 1999)

21st century 

 The Devil's Backbone (Guillermo del Toro, 2001)
 Mulholland Drive (David Lynch, 2001)
 High Tension (Alexandre Aja, 2003)
 Inland Empire (David Lynch, 2006)
 Pan's Labyrinth (Guillermo del Toro, 2006)
 Frontier(s) (Xavier Gens, 2007)
 Teeth (Mitchell Lichtenstein, 2007)
 Funny Games (Michael Haneke, 2007)
 Martyrs (Pascal Laugier, 2008)
 Let the Right One In (Tomas Alfredson, 2008)
 Coraline (Henry Selick, 2009)
 Antichrist (Lars von Trier, 2009)
 Beyond the Black Rainbow (Panos Cosmatos, 2010)
 Black Swan (Darren Aronofsky, 2010)
 A Field in England, (Ben Wheatley, 2013)
 Under the Skin (Jonathan Glazer, 2013)
 Only Lovers Left Alive (Jim Jarmusch, 2013)
 Enemy (Denis Villeneuve, 2013)
 The Babadook (Jennifer Kent, 2014)
 It Follows (David Robert Mitchell), 2014)
 The Witch (Robert Eggers, 2015)
 The Neon Demon (Nicholas Winding Refn, 2016)
 Shin Godzilla (Hideaki Anno, 2016)
Raw (Julia Ducournau, 2016)
 Kizumonogatari (Tatsuya Oishi, 2016)
 Mother! (Darren Aronofsky, 2017)
 Get Out (Jordan Peele, 2017)
 One Cut of the Dead (Shin'ichirō Head, 2017)
 Hereditary (Ari Aster, 2018)
A Quiet Place (John Krasinski, 2018)
 Annihilation (Alex Garland, 2018)
 Suspiria (Luca Guadagnino, 2018)
 Mandy (Panos Cosmatos, 2018)
 Midsommar (Ari Aster, 2019)
 The Lighthouse (Robert Eggers, 2019)
 Us (Jordan Peele, 2019)
 Saint Maud (Rose Glass, 2019)
 Roh (Emir Ezwan, 2019)
 Impetigore (Joko Anwar, 2019)
 Relic (Natalie Erika James, 2020)
 Friend of the World (Brian Patrick Butler, 2020)
 Cryptozoo (Dash Shaw, 2021)
 Lamb (Valdimar Jóhannsson, 2021)
 Titane (Julia Ducournau, 2021)

Notable directors 

 Abel Ferrara
 David Cronenberg
 Stanley Kubrick
 Takashi Miike
 Roman Polanski
 Lars von Trier
 Jacques Tourneur
 Ari Aster
 Werner Herzog
 Robert Eggers
 Nicholas Roeg
 David Lynch
 Herk Harvey
 Dario Argento
 Mario Bava
 Panos Cosmatos
 Guillermo del Toro
Joko Anwar
Alfred Hitchcock
Michael Haneke
Marina de Van
Alexandre Aja
Julia Ducournau
Jordan Peele

See also
Arthouse animation
Social thriller
New Hollywood
New French Extremity
Arthouse musical
Arthouse science fiction film
Arthouse action film
Vulgar auteurism
Extreme cinema
Postmodern horror

References

Further reading 
 
 
 Stuart Hanscomb (2010). "Existentialism and Art-Horror", Sartre Studies International 16:1, pp. 1–23.

External links 
 List of art-horror films - Taste of Cinema blog 
 "The Ultimate List of Art-house Horror" - IMDB

Film genres
Horror films by genre
Experimental film
Film styles
Visual arts
1920s in film
1930s in film
1940s in film
1960s in film
1970s in film
1980s in film
1990s in film
2000s in film
2010s in film
2020s in film